Liothorax kraatzi is a species of dung beetle with a widespread distribution from Southeastern Europe, Asia Minor, to Caucasus, and Central Asia.

Description
This small shiny, cylindrical beetle has the average length about 4.0 to 5.0 mm. Body elongate, convex, and glabrous. Body black in color with pale brown antennal club. Legs are reddish brown. Anteriorly gibbose head at middle with fine punctures. Clypeus weakly sinuate with a rounded genae. Pronotum convex, and transverse. Pronotum has dual, irregular, dense punctures. Scutellum consists with sparse punctures. Elytra elongate, parallel-sided with deep striae and distinct punctures.

They mostly inhabit open habitats, such as damp soil. Beetles are usually abundant during late spring, summer, and autumn. Some specimens have been collected from horse dung.

References 

Scarabaeidae
Beetles of Asia
Beetles of Europe
Insects of Sri Lanka
Taxa named by Edgar von Harold
Beetles described in 1868